The 2010 National Invitation Tournament was a single-elimination tournament of 32 
National Collegiate Athletic Association (NCAA) Division I teams that were not selected to participate in the 2010 NCAA Division I men's basketball tournament. The 73rd annual tournament began on March 16 on campus sites and ended on April 1 at Madison Square Garden in New York City. Dayton won their 3rd NIT title (first title since 1968) over North Carolina, 79–68.

Participants

Automatic qualifiers
The following teams were automatic qualifiers for the 2010 NIT field after losing in their respective conference tournaments; by virtue of winning their conferences' regular season championship and not qualifying for the NCAA tournament.

*Jacksonville split the Atlantic Sun regular season title with Campbell, Lipscomb and Belmont, but the conference tournament was won by fifth-seeded East Tennessee State.  The Dolphins earned the automatic NIT bid by advancing the furthest of the four in the Atlantic Sun tournament even though Lipscomb was the #1 seed in the tournament.

The entire 32-team field was announced on March 14, 2010 on The NIT Selection Show at 9 pm ET on ESPNU.

Seedings

Bracket
Played on the home court of the higher-seeded team (except #1 Illinois in the first round)

Illinois bracket

First round

Second round

Quarterfinals

Arizona State bracket

First round

Second round

Quarterfinals

Virginia Tech bracket

First round

Second round

Quarterfinals

Mississippi State bracket

First round

Second round

Quarterfinals

NIT Final Four
Played at Madison Square Garden in New York City

Semifinals

Finals

Broadcasters

Television

Local Radio

See also
 2010 Women's National Invitation Tournament
 2010 NCAA Division I men's basketball tournament
 2010 NCAA Division II men's basketball tournament
 2010 NCAA Division III men's basketball tournament
 2010 NCAA Division I women's basketball tournament
 2010 NCAA Division II women's basketball tournament
 2010 NCAA Division III women's basketball tournament
 2010 NAIA Division I men's basketball tournament
 2010 NAIA Division II men's basketball tournament
 2010 NAIA Division I women's basketball tournament
 2010 NAIA Division II women's basketball tournament
 2010 College Basketball Invitational
 2010 CollegeInsider.com Postseason Tournament

References

National Invitation
National Invitation Tournament
2010s in Manhattan
National Invitation Tournament
Basketball in New York City
College sports in New York City
Madison Square Garden
National Invitation Tournament
National Invitation Tournament
Sports competitions in New York City
Sports in Manhattan